Djegui Koita (born 5 August 1999) is a Malian professional footballer who plays as a defender for Championnat National 2 club Jura Sud.

Career
Having started his career in the youth ranks of Linas-Montlhéry, Koita signed his first professional contract with Guingamp 15 June 2018. He made his professional debut for the club in a 0–0 Ligue 1 tie with Caen on 20 October 2018.

On 7 January 2022, Koita signed for Championnat National 2 side Jura Sud.

References

External links
 
 

1999 births
Living people
People from Oyonnax
Sportspeople from Ain
Malian footballers
Association football defenders
ESA Linas-Montlhéry players
En Avant Guingamp players
Jura Sud Foot players
Championnat National 3 players
Ligue 1 players
Championnat National 2 players
Malian expatriate footballers
Malian expatriate sportspeople in France
Expatriate footballers in France
21st-century Malian people
Footballers from Auvergne-Rhône-Alpes